Antioch Baptist Church North is a Evangelical Baptist megachurch in Atlanta, Georgia. It is affiliated with the National Baptist Convention, USA.

History
The Antioch Baptist Church North was founded in 1877 in Atlanta, Georgia by Oscar Young, Miles Crawford, Jordan Beavers and Lem Wright.  In 1969, Cameron M. Alexander became the senior pastor until 2018.  In 2019, Kenneth Alexander became the new pastor.

Notable members
Herman Cain

References 
Notes

External links

Official website

Baptist churches in Atlanta
1877 establishments in Georgia (U.S. state)
African-American churches
National Baptist Convention, USA churches